Jorne Spileers (born 21 January 2005) is a Belgian footballer who currently plays as a defender for Club NXT.

Career statistics

Club

Notes

References

2005 births
Living people
Belgian footballers
Belgium youth international footballers
Association football defenders
Challenger Pro League players
S.V. Zulte Waregem players
Club Brugge KV players
Club NXT players